Viviana Ferrari (born 25 March 1992) is a team handball player from Uruguay. She plays on the Uruguay women's national handball team, and participated at the 2011 World Women's Handball Championship in Brazil.

In 2010, she competed in the Youth World Handball Championship in Dominican Republic.

References

1992 births
Living people
Uruguayan female handball players
Handball players at the 2015 Pan American Games
Pan American Games bronze medalists for Uruguay
Pan American Games medalists in handball
Medalists at the 2015 Pan American Games
21st-century Uruguayan women